Roy Bailey (1889–1935) was an Australian rules footballer who played for the Lefroy Football Club in the Tasmanian Football League between 1907–1914.

Football career
Bailey was of Tasmanian Football's first star players and in 1907 became a regular player in the Lefroy team. In the next eight seasons, Bailey was one of the finest defenders in Tasmania.

Bailey played in 2 premierships for Lefroy in the TFL 1907, 1912 and 1 State Premiership also in 1912.

Bailey would not play football after 1914, ending his career aged 25.

References

External links
 https://afltashalloffame.com.au/inductees/2-roy-bailey/

1889 births
1935 deaths
Lefroy Football Club players
Tasmanian Football Hall of Fame inductees
Australian rules footballers from Western Australia